Paul Charles Martin (March 9, 1932 – October 11, 2011) was an American professional baseball player. He was born at Brownstown, Pennsylvania.

Martin was a 1950s bonus baby who joined the Pirates' MLB roster immediately after signing his first pro contract in 1955. In his debut, he hurled two scoreless innings in relief against that season's eventual world champions, the Brooklyn Dodgers.  In his second appearance, on July 5, he started against the defending world champions, the New York Giants. But Martin walked Alvin Dark, Willie Mays and Dusty Rhodes and hit Don Mueller with a pitch in the first inning, failed to record an out, and was tagged with the loss, his only Major League decision.

Martin sustained a career-ending arm injury that season. After an August 16 outing as a reliever, he never pitched in another professional game.

In seven Major League innings, Martin gave up 11 earned runs and 13 hits. Plagued by wildness, he issued 17 bases on balls, with one wild pitch and one hit batsman, while striking out three.

Martin died in 2011 in San Diego, California, at the age of 79.

References

External links

Major League Baseball pitchers
Pittsburgh Pirates players
Baseball players from Pennsylvania
1932 births
2011 deaths
People from Lancaster County, Pennsylvania